Notoreas galaxias is a species of moth in the family Geometridae. This species is endemic to New Zealand.

Taxonomy 
This species was described by George Hudson in 1928 using material collected in February 1906 in the Old Man Range in Central Otago at an elevation of about 1200 metres by J. H. Lewis. The genus Notoreas was reviewed in 1986 by R. C. Craw and the placement of this species within it was confirmed. However this species may be of dubious taxonomic status. The holotype specimen is held at the National Museum of New Zealand Te Papa Tongarewa.

Description 

Hudson described the species as follows:

Distribution 
This species is endemic to New Zealand. It has been found in Central Otago at its type locality of Old Man Range as well as in the Dansey Ecological District and at Slate Basin and Symmetry Peak in the Eyre Ecological District.

Biology and behaviour 
This species is on the wing in February and March.

Habitat and host species 
N. galaxias prefers herbfield alpine habitat. Larvae of this moth have been found to feed on species in the Kelleria and Drapetes genera.

References

Moths described in 1928
Moths of New Zealand
Larentiinae
Endemic fauna of New Zealand
Taxa named by George Hudson
Endemic moths of New Zealand